Edward Brabazon, 4th Earl of Meath (c.1638 – 22 February 1707) was an Anglo-Irish politician, peer and soldier.

Brabazon was the son of Edward Brabazon, 2nd Earl of Meath and Mary Chambré. He was a captain in a regiment of foot in 1661. Between June and August 1666 he was briefly the Member of Parliament for Wicklow County in the Irish House of Commons. In 1675 he was appointed Ranger of all the Royal Parks in Ireland and in 1679 he was made a member of the Privy Council of Ireland.

He succeeded to his brother's title as Earl of Meath in 1684. In 1685, Brabazon was appointed Custos Rotulorum of County Dublin and Kildare. Following the Glorious Revolution, he supported William III of England and became a colonel of a regiment of foot in his army in Ireland in 1689. The same year, he was attainted in absentia by James II's Patriot Parliament in Dublin. He fought in the Siege of Carrickfergus, Battle of the Boyne and the Siege of Limerick, where he was wounded. In 1690 was reaffirmed as a Privy Counsellor.

Brabazon was Governor of the Company of the Royal Fishery of Ireland 1692 and a Commissioner of the Great Seal of Ireland in 1693, 1697 and 1702.

He married twice, but died without issue and was succeeded in his title by his younger brother, Chambré Brabazon.

References

Year of birth uncertain
1707 deaths
17th-century Anglo-Irish people
18th-century Anglo-Irish people
Earls in the Peerage of Ireland
4
Irish MPs 1661–1666
Irish soldiers
Members of the Irish House of Lords
Members of the Parliament of Ireland (pre-1801) for County Wicklow constituencies
Members of the Privy Council of Ireland
People convicted under a bill of attainder
Williamite military personnel of the Williamite War in Ireland